Elber Evora (born 2 December 1999) is a professional footballer who currently plays as a goalkeeper. Born in the Netherlands, Evora represents the Cape Verde national team.

International career
Evora first represented the Cape Verde national team in a friendly 2-1 loss to Guinea on 10 October 2020.

Career statistics

Club

Notes

References

1999 births
Living people
Footballers from Rotterdam
Citizens of Cape Verde through descent
Cape Verdean footballers
Cape Verde international footballers
Dutch footballers
Dutch sportspeople of Cape Verdean descent
Association football goalkeepers
SC Feyenoord players
Feyenoord players
AZ Alkmaar players
Jong AZ players
AEL Limassol players
Eerste Divisie players
Cape Verdean expatriate footballers
Expatriate footballers in Cyprus
Cape Verdean expatriate sportspeople in Cyprus